The 1971 San Francisco Bay oil spill occurred when two Standard Oil Company of California tankers, the Arizona Standard and the Oregon Standard, collided on January 18, 1971, in the San Francisco Bay. The resulting 800,000 gallon spill, the largest in Bay Area history, threatened sensitive natural habitats both inside and outside the bay, including the Bolinas Lagoon, and contributed to the growth of activism against pollution, after thousands of bay area residents volunteered to clean up beaches and rescue oil soaked birds. A number of environmental organizations had their origins in the spill cleanup.  Standard Oil spent more than $1 million in the clean-up.

Inception of International Bird Rescue and volunteerism
In March 1971, California's Fish and Game Department estimated that 7,000 birds were oiled during the incident, most of which died prior to collection or while being taken into care. At the end of January 1971, roughly 200 of the 1600 birds "brought in" were still alive. Ultimately less than 80 of those survived. 

The resulting environmental destruction from the spill, specifically the avian population, prompted volunteers to rescue some 4,300 birds.  At the time, knowledge on how to care for oiled birds was low. Despite best efforts, only 300 or so animals were ever deemed fit to be released. The remnants of this volunteer force eventually resulted in the creation of the International Bird Rescue in an endeavor to increase knowledge and research in bird rescue.  One of the largest volunteer turnouts since the 1906 San Francisco earthquake came of this event.

See also

Cosco Busan oil spill
List of oil spills
John Francis, an environmentalist whose career began with the spill

References

External links
Photographs of the spill at SmugMug
40th anniversary blog  at the International Bird Rescue Research (founded at the time of the spill)
"The early bird gets the oily bird", a first hand account of the volunteer bird cleaning efforts at FoundSF
PRBO Conservation Science originating in the spill
PBS film of work constructing oil barriers at Bolinas Lagoon during the spill

Oil spills in the United States
San Francisco Bay oil spill
Environment of the San Francisco Bay Area
Disasters in California
Petroleum in California
Standard Oil
San Francisco Bay oil spill
San Francisco Bay oil spill
San Francisco Bay oil spill
Environmental issues in California
History of the San Francisco Bay Area